Stigler Regional Airport  is a city-owned, public-use airport located three nautical miles (6 km) northeast of the central business district of Stigler, a city in Haskell County, Oklahoma, United States. It is included in the National Plan of Integrated Airport Systems for 2011–2015, which categorized it as a general aviation facility.

Although most U.S. airports use the same three-letter location identifier for the FAA and IATA, this airport is assigned GZL by the FAA, but has no designation from the IATA.

Facilities and aircraft 
Stigler Regional Airport covers an area of 166 acres (67 ha) at an elevation of 599 feet (183 m) above mean sea level. It has one runway designated 17/35 with an asphalt surface measuring 4,296 by 60 feet (1,309 x 18 m).

For the 12-month period ending July 27, 2009, the airport had 5,500 general aviation aircraft operations, an average of 15 per day. At that time there were 4 aircraft based at this airport: 75% single-engine and 25% multi-engine.

References

External links 
 Stigler Regional Airport (GZL) at Oklahoma Aeronautics Commission
 Aerial image as of March 1995 from USGS The National Map
 

Airports in Oklahoma
Haskell County, Oklahoma